Girl Can't Help It may refer to:
 The Girl Can't Help It, a 1956 film
 "The Girl Can't Help It" (song)
 "Girl Can't Help It" (song), a 1986 song by Journey
 Girls Can't Help It, an early 1980s all-girl British pop trio, put together by Colin Campsie and George McFarlane of the Quick